Orazio Mochi (1571–1625) was an Italian sculptor of the late-Mannerist period, active mainly in Florence. He was a pupil of Giuseppe Caccini. The sculptor Francesco Mochi was his son.

Sources

1571 births
1625 deaths
16th-century Italian sculptors
Italian male sculptors
17th-century Italian sculptors
Sculptors from Tuscany